The canton of Moréac is an administrative division of the Morbihan department, northwestern France. It was created at the French canton reorganisation which came into effect in March 2015. Its seat is in Moréac.

It consists of the following communes:
 
Bignan
Billio
Bohal
Buléon
Caro
Guéhenno
Lizio
Malestroit
Missiriac
Moréac
Pleucadeuc
Plumelec
Ruffiac
Saint-Abraham
Saint-Allouestre
Saint-Congard
Saint-Guyomard
Saint-Jean-Brévelay
Saint-Laurent-sur-Oust
Saint-Marcel
Saint-Nicolas-du-Tertre
Sérent
Val d'Oust

References

Cantons of Morbihan